Christian Kert (born July 25, 1946 in Salon-de-Provence, Bouches-du-Rhône) is a member of the National Assembly of France.  He represented Bouches-du-Rhône's 11th constituency, from 1988 to 2012 as a member of the Union for a Popular Movement.

References

1946 births
Living people
People from Salon-de-Provence
Centre of Social Democrats politicians
Union for French Democracy politicians
Union for a Popular Movement politicians
Deputies of the 11th National Assembly of the French Fifth Republic
Deputies of the 12th National Assembly of the French Fifth Republic
Deputies of the 13th National Assembly of the French Fifth Republic
Deputies of the 14th National Assembly of the French Fifth Republic